Bana is an Afro-Asiatic language spoken in northern Cameroon.  Dialects include Gamboura and Gili.

Bana is spoken in the canton of Guili, in the northern part of the commune of Bourrha (department of Mayo-Tsanaga, Far North Region). The speakers call their language koma kabana 'the language of the Bana'.

Phonology

The vowels of Bana are /ɨ ə ɛ/, which can occur with high, falling, low, or rising tone.

Notes

References
 

Biu-Mandara languages
Languages of Cameroon